The Ibrahim Pasha Mosque,, is the third-largest mosque on the Balkan Peninsula and the second-largest in Bulgaria. Located in the town of Razgrad, the mosque is one of the most exquisite examples of Ottoman classical architecture.

History

First Mosque of Ibrahim Pasha
The Mosque of Ibrahim Pasha was a mosque built by Ibrahim Pasha of Parga in Razgrad in 1533, and it is believed to be the first-ever congregational mosque in Razgrad. The 1533 Deed of Trust of Ibrahim Pasha testifies on the existence of such a temple and provides information on its appearance, architecture, and staff: the mosque was built upon a firm foundation and had one-of-a-kind columns. In the courtyard of the temple, there was a fountain used for the Islamic procedure of cleansing Wudu, a Medrese-style school, 8 bathrooms, as well as a caravanserai. The mosque employed at least 12 people – 3 of them being religious leaders and two teachers. There was even a hammam, which was operative till the 70s of the 20th century.

It is believed that such a mosque complex, initially a waqf (charitable endowment), is the reason why the town of Razgrad received its statute of kasaba("town").

Though left unfinished, the mosque was functional until 1600, but due to an unknown reason between the years of 1600–1610 it was demolished. The most plausible hypothesis according to Prof. Machiel Kiel is that it might have been destroyed by an earthquake. However, the question why the first mosque was torn down is still open. The remnants of the original mosque were found during archaeological excavations in 1986.

Second Ibrahim Pasha Mosque  
The construction of the new mosque was finished in 1616–1617 (1025 by the Lunar Hijri calendar). This is evident from the marble sign, where the year of construction is engraved as 1025 by the Hijri calendar. This marble sign also testifies to the fact that even though the mosque was commenced by Ibrahim Pasha, it was finished by Mahmud Pasha. Since the building is dated to some 80 years after the death of Ibrahim Pasha, it is speculated that the mosque was named after him because not only was it built upon the old mosque of Ibrahim Pasha, but it was also the land on which the mosque was built belonged to the Pasha himself.

The style of the mosque follows the trends set by Mimar Sinan, but is also influenced by a new generation of architects who challenge the tradition and enrich the architecture by introducing new elements.

Architectural features 

The mosque is a single-domed building, made entirely of stone, built on a square base. The mosque is built of limestone blocks of light-yellow colour and grainy structure. The blocks are of homogeneous material, making it unlikely that the blocks were taken from the old mosque or the Roman town of Abritus. All stones are perfectly polished and built in rows with a thin joint. Some of them are attached with iron clamps and soldered with lead – a preventive measure, used by the Ottomans to protect minarets during earthquakes. (It is believed that this feature of the mosque is the reason it withstood the 9 earthquakes in Romania between 1701 and 1997.) In addition, the masons reinforced the mortar by putting egg whites in it.
All façades end in height with a common narrow and elegant classical cornice. Three of them (except for the north-western façade) are based on a stone plinth.
There are 45 windows on the four façades – on three of them there are 13 windows, and on the front façade, there are 6.

There are nearly 50 little birdhouses (arched holes), making it the only Bulgarian monument of Ottoman heritage with so many birdhouses on its façades. This feature highlights the relationship between the Ottoman Muslims and the birds, which is highly influenced by the Quran and the Muslim concept that birds are divine creatures that live in "communities" as people do.

Current state 
The mosque continues to be one of the most emblematic symbols of the town of Razgrad. Since 1971, the mosque has had the status of a national monument of "national significance", and since 2001 the ruins of the old mosque are also considered an archaeological monument.
The temple has been out of service for almost 40 years, since the mid-1980s. 

Restoration of the mosque began in 2020. The project, worth BGN 2,374,836, provided by the state budget, envisages conservation, restoration, and adaptation of the Ibrahim Pasha Mosque. The restoration is expected to be finished 800 days after its beginning (possibly in 2023).

See also
 Islam in Bulgaria

References

Ottoman mosques in Bulgaria
Razgrad
Buildings and structures in Razgrad Province
Former mosques in Bulgaria